The Motorcycle Boy were a Scottish indie pop band formed in Edinburgh, Scotland, in 1987 by former members of Meat Whiplash and The Shop Assistants.

History
The band consisted of Alex Taylor (vocals, formerly of The Shop Assistants), with Paul McDermott (drums), Michael Kerr (guitar), and Eddy Connelly (bass) (all formerly of Meat Whiplash), and David "Scottie" Scott (guitar). They were signed by Rough Trade Records, who issued their debut single, "Big Rock Candy Mountain", which reached number 2 in the UK Independent Chart.  The band were then signed up by Chrysalis Records, with two singles and debut album Scarlet that was never released, but failed to achieve great success despite considerable press attention. The band then split with Chrysalis, with two further singles released on the Nymphaea Pink Sensation label in 1990, before the band themselves split up.

The band made the cover of the NME on September 19, 1987, despite only having a brief half-page feature.  This was because the entire contents of a themed issue on censorship (which would have had a painting used on the Dead Kennedys' album Frankenchrist, then the subject of an obscenity trial in the United States, on the cover) had themselves been censored, with Stuart Cosgrove sacked from the paper, and a new cover had to be designed at very short notice.

Forgotten Astronaut Records have procured the licence for the unreleased album Scarlet, and released the album in late 2019. It was released on both CD and vinyl with the CD containing two bonus tracks, the Flood produced "Sweet Dreams Pretty Baby", and the Pat Collier produced "Days Like These".

It was revealed in 2020 that Alex Taylor had died in 2005.

Discography

Singles
"Big Rock Candy Mountain" (7") (1987) Rough Trade RT 210 
 A. Big Rock Candy Mountain - 3:13
 B. Room At The Top - 3:55
"Big Rock Candy Mountain" (12") (1987) Rough Trade RTT 210
 A. Big Rock Candy Mountain (Velocity Dance Mix) - 4:40
 B1. Room At The Top - 3:55
 B2. His Latest Flame - 2:18
 B3. Big Rock Candy Mountain (7" Mix) - 3:13
"Hey Mama" (12" white label promo copy) (1988) Blue Guitar / Chrysalis AZURX 10
 A. Hey Mama (Born Bad Mix) 
 B1. Days Like These 
 B2. Will You Still Love Me Tomorrow 
 B3. Hey Mama (7" Version) 
"Trying To Be Kind" (7") (26 June 1989) Chrysalis CHS 3310
 A. Trying To Be Kind
 B. world Falls Into Place
"Trying To Be Kind" (12") (26 June 1989) Chrysalis CHS 12 3310
 A. Trying To Be Kind (Extended Mix)
 B1. World Falls Into Place
 B2. Will You Love Me Tomorrow
 B3. Trying To Be Kind (1,000cc Version)
"You And Me Against The World" (7") (1989) Chrysalis CHS 3398
A. You And Me Against The World
B. Under The Bridge
"You And Me Against The World" (12″) (1989) Chrysalis CHS 12 3398
A. You And Me Against The World
B1. Under The Bridge
B2. Some Girls
B3. You And Me Against The World (Extended Mix)
"The Road Goes On Forever" (12") (1990) Nymphaea Pink Sensation NPS T001
A1. Starlight - 3:20
A2. Starlight (Paradise A Go-Go Mix) - 5:05
B1. The Road Goes On Forever (Overdrive Karma Mix) - 5:16
B2. Salvation - 3:13
B3. The Road Goes On Forever- 3:26
"Here She Comes" (12") (1990) Nymphaea Pink Sensation NPS T002
A. Here She Comes
B1. Everything I See
B3. The Road Goes On Forever (Live)

Albums

Scarlet (2019) Forgotten Astronaut Records
1. Hey Mama
2. Baby Let Go Of My Heart
3. The World Falls Into Place
4. Valentine
5. No Pain
6. Take Me For A Walk
7. Some Girls
8. Under The Bridge
9. Trying To Be Kind
10. Scarlet
11. Big Rock Candy Mountain
12. Up Here
13. Sweet Dreams Pretty Baby (Bonus track)
14. Days Like These (Bonus track)

Appearance on compilation albums
"Indie Top 20 Volume III - War Of Independents" (2LP) (1988) Beechwood Music TT03
 A6. Big Rock Candy Mountain  - 3:13
"Indie Top 20 Volume III - War Of Independents" (2Cass) (1988) Beechwood Music, Melody Maker TT03MC
 A6. Big Rock Candy Mountain
"Art Of Compilation CD 7" (CD, Promo) (1991) Art Of Mix CD 7
 7. Here She Comes (Digi Boy Mix) - 6:51
"Precision Three" (12", Promo) (1991) Art Of Mix AMP-9003
 A2. Here She Comes (Digi Boy Mix)

Bibliography
 "Shop Assistants, The Fizzbombs, The Motorcycle Boy" chapter in YinPop: Women in Indie and Alternative Rock, Vol. 1: UK Bands (2014), by S. White. Fly-By-Night Books, pp. 131-148.

References

Scottish pop music groups
Chrysalis Records artists